Euarestopsis paupera is a species of tephritid or fruit flies in the genus Euarestopsis of the family Tephritidae.

Distribution
Costa Rica.

References

Tephritinae
Insects described in 1937
Diptera of South America